Edward William Boers (March 10, 1884 – April 2, 1929) was a seaman serving in the United States Navy who received the Medal of Honor for bravery.

Biography
For his actions received the Medal January 5, 1906.

He died April 2, 1929, and is buried in Vine Street Hill Cemetery Cincinnati, Ohio. His grave can be found in section 1, lot 111.

Medal of Honor citation
Rank and organization: Seaman, U.S. Navy. Born: 10 March 1884, Cincinnati, Ohio. Accredited to: Kentucky. G.O. No.: 13, 5 January 1906.

Citation
On board the U.S.S. Bennington, 21 July 1905. Following the explosion of a boiler of that vessel, Boers displayed extraordinary heroism in the resulting action.

See also

List of Medal of Honor recipients in non-combat incidents

References

External links

1884 births
1929 deaths
United States Navy Medal of Honor recipients
United States Navy sailors
Military personnel from Cincinnati
People from Kentucky
Burials in Ohio
Non-combat recipients of the Medal of Honor
Burials at Vine Street Hill Cemetery